Naushad Waheed (born December 15, 1962, in Malé) is a cartoonist and painter from the Maldives.
He was detained by the government for four months following the publication of one of his cartoons in the magazine Hukuru in 1999.  In 2001 he was arrested for participating in debates critical of the government, tried for treason, and sentenced to 15 years in prison.  He was released on February 22, 2006. Naushad Waheed is also the brother of Dr. Mohammed Waheed Hassan, a leading political figure who served as the 5th president of Maldives from 7 February 2012 to 17 November 2013. He was appointed as Deputy High Commissioner of Maldives to the UK in 2008 after the new government settled into place.

References

External links
 Naushad Arts
 Naushad's Biography
 Amnesty International press release
 Official website of Dr. Waheed, Naushad's brother
 High Commission role for Naushad

 Mohammed Waheed Hassan

1962 births
Living people
Maldivian journalists
People from Malé
20th-century Maldivian writers
21st-century Maldivian writers